Jaya Grocer is a Malaysian upscale supermarket chain. As of 2021, it operates 40 stores in Peninsular Malaysia, with most of its locations in the Klang Valley.

The chain was founded in 2007 by the Teng family, aiming to establish a premium supermarket brand. The family previously founded the Teng Minimarket Centre in Bangsar and the Giant supermarket chain before selling both retailers to Hong Kong-based DFI Retail Group. AIGF Advisors, a private equity investor, acquired a 45% stake in Jaya Grocer in 2016 after investing  in the chain in 2016. Teng Yew Huat owned the remaining 55% of the company. The Teng family bought back AIGF's stake in 2021.

Jaya Grocer became a subsidiary of Grab, a Singaporean technology company, following its acquisition of the supermarket chain from the Teng family seventeen days after the family's buyback of AIGF's stake. Grab CEO and co-founder Anthony Tan said that the acquisition would allow the company to deliver on-demand groceries to customers faster. Victor Chua, managing partner of Kuala Lumpur-based venture capital firm Vynn Capital, described the Grab acquisition as a "strategic move" by allowing Grab to strengthen its supply chain and expand its business to encompass offline operations.

References 

Supermarkets of Malaysia